Nama Fofana (born 12 July 1990) is a French professional footballer who plays as a defender for Championnat National club Châteauroux.

Personal life
Fofana is of Malian descent.

Career statistics
.

References

External links
 
 

1990 births
Living people
Sportspeople from Créteil
French footballers
French people of Malian descent
Association football defenders
US Créteil-Lusitanos players
Luçon FC players
Athlético Marseille players
LB Châteauroux players
Championnat National players
Footballers from Val-de-Marne